John Robert Walter Redman (10 July 1914 – 5 July 1945) was an Australian rugby league player who played of the 1930s and an RAAF officer who was killed in the Pacific theatre of WWII.

Background
John Robert Walter Redman was born at Canterbury, New South Wales in 1914, and played rugby league from a young age.

Playing career
He debuted in first grade for University in 1933 and played 10 games for the club between 1933-1934. After completing his studies, he joined Balmain in 1935 and went on to become one of the best lock-forwards in Sydney rugby league until his last season in 1940.

Redman was selected for NSW City Firsts, playing in one representative game in 1939.

Military career and death
He joined the RAAF in 1941 and did not play rugby league again. He rose to squadron leader and was shot down over Borneo on 5 July 1945, five days before his 31st birthday.

References

1914 births
1945 deaths
Balmain Tigers players
Sydney University rugby league team players
Australian rugby league players
Australian military personnel killed in World War II
Rugby league locks
Rugby league players from Sydney
Royal Australian Air Force personnel of World War II
Royal Australian Air Force officers